Eupsophus is a genus of frogs in the family Alsodidae.  They are sometimes known as ground frogs. The genus is endemic to Patagonia (Chile and Argentina). Eupsophus is the second most species-rich frog genera of Patagonia. These frogs are restricted to forested areas at southern latitudes.

Reproduction
In most species, the tadpoles are endotrophic (developing without external food sources) and develop in water housed in small hollows in the forest floor or holes at the end of flooded tunnels. Males call from inside burrows and may engage in duets with their nearest neighbours. They also show parental care: males remain by the clutch, and later on also by the tadpoles, in small aquatic microhabitats in the ground; this behaviour is associated with significant weight loss.

Species
There are ten species in this genus:
 Eupsophus altor Nuñez, Rabanal, and Formas, 2012
 Eupsophus calcaratus (Günther, 1881)
 Eupsophus contulmoensis Ortiz, Ibarra-Vidal, and Formas, 1989
 Eupsophus emiliopugini Formas, 1989
 Eupsophus insularis (Philippi, 1902)
 Eupsophus migueli Formas, 1978
 Eupsophus nahuelbutensis Ortiz and Ibarra-Vidal, 1992
 Eupsophus roseus (Duméril and Bibron, 1841)
 Eupsophus septentrionalis Ibarra-Vidal, Ortiz, and Torres-Pérez, 2004
 Eupsophus vertebralis Grandison, 1961

References

 
Alsodidae
Amphibians of South America
Amphibians of Patagonia
Amphibian genera